Chinedu Udoji (22 December 1989 – 18 February 2018) was a Nigerian professional footballer who played for Enyimba and Kano Pillars, as a midfielder. He died in a car crash on 18 February 2018, aged 28.

References

1989 births
2018 deaths
Nigerian footballers
Enyimba F.C. players
Kano Pillars F.C. players
Association football midfielders
Nigeria Professional Football League players
Road incident deaths in Nigeria